Epidola nuraghella is a moth of the family Gelechiidae. It was described by Friedrich Hartig in 1939. It is found on Corsica, Sardinia and Sicily.

References

Moths described in 1939
Epidola